The 2016–17 Ligat Nashim is the 19th season of women's league football under the Israeli Football Association. League schedule began on 8 November 2016. The defending champions are F.C. Ramat HaSharon, having won the title the previous season.

Prior to the beginning of the season the two divisions were renamed, Ligat Nashim Rishona becoming Women's Premier League and Ligat Nashim Shniya becoming Women's Leumit League.

In the premier league, F.C. Kiryat Gat won its first championship while Bnot Sakhnin relegated. Hapoel Ra'anana won Women's Liga Leumit and was promoted to the top division.

Premier League

Regular season

2nd-3rd place match 
As F.C. Ramat HaSharon and ASA Tel Aviv finished level on points, a match was arranged to set the placing of each team at the end of regular seasons, in order to determine the two teams' order of matches. The match was played on 7 March 2017, and was abandoned at the 55th minute, with Ramat HaSharon leading 5–0, as ASA appeared to the match with only 11 players and four of them had to leave the pitch due to injuries. Therefore, Ramat HaSharon was placed second and ASA third.

Championship round

Relegation round

Top scorers

Leumit League

References

External links
Ligat Nashim Rishona @IFA
Ligat Nashim Shniya @IFA

Ligat Nashim seasons
1
women
Israel